The Berlin Commercial District is an historic district in Berlin, Worcester County, Maryland.  It consists of a collection of approximately 47 late-19th century commercial buildings. They are small-scaled, one- to three-story buildings that occupy both sides of the main thoroughfare and its secondary arterials.  The buildings form a visually cohesive and pleasing streetscape, the majority of which are constructed in the row fashion with party or common walls.

It was added to the National Register of Historic Places in 1980.

References

External links
, including photo dated 1989, at Maryland Historical Trust
Boundary Map of the Berlin Commercial Historic District, Worcester County, at Maryland Historical Trust

Berlin, Maryland
Geography of Worcester County, Maryland
Historic districts on the National Register of Historic Places in Maryland
Commercial buildings on the National Register of Historic Places in Maryland
National Register of Historic Places in Worcester County, Maryland